McClusky Municipal Airport  is a public airport located two miles (3.2 km) southwest of the central business district of McClusky, North Dakota, in Sheridan County, North Dakota, United States. It is owned by the McClusky Municipal Airport Authority.

Facilities and aircraft

For the 12-month period ending February 10, 1998, the airport had 510 aircraft operations: 98% general aviation and 2% air taxi.

References

External links

Airports in North Dakota
Buildings and structures in Sheridan County, North Dakota
Transportation in Sheridan County, North Dakota